Have Sword, Will Travel is a 1969 Hong Kong wuxia film directed by Chang Cheh and starring Ti Lung, David Chiang and Lee Ching.

Plot
The upright and invincible leader of the Wulin clan Lord Yin Ke Feng (Cheng Miu) helps the Luoyang government to escort two hundred million worth of gold annually and has never made a mistake. However, he accidentally loses his martial arts skills and the gold is stolen by Chao Hong (Ku Feng), leader of the Flying Tigers thieves. Lone swordsman Lu Yi (David Chiang) meets Yun Piao Piao (Lee Ching) and her fiance Siang Ding (Ti Lung), who are bodyguards for the gold. First, they fight each other before joining forces to help Yin to defeat Chao. Originally down and out, Lu is taken in by the gentle Yun and volunteers to be a bodyguard. He becomes acquainted with her through his warm-blooded actions.

Cast
Ti Lung as Siang Ding
David Chiang as Lu Yi
Lee Ching as Yun Piao Piao
Wong Chung as The Mute
Ku Feng as Chao Hong
Chan Sing as Mao Biao
Cheng Miu as Lord Yin Ke Feng
Cheng Lui as Wong Chuen
Wang Kuang Yu as one of Lord Yin's men
Hung Lau as Chu Tin Hou, a Flying Tiger
Lau Gong as a Flying Tiger
Cliff Lok as a Flying Tiger
Cheng Kang Yeh as Yang Hang Chiu
Wong Ching Ho as Government official
Lo Hung
Yuen Cheung-yan
Yuen Shun Yi
Wong Pau Kei
Fung Hak On
Lo Wai
Chan Chuen
Tsang Cho Lam as Waiter
Danny Chow
Yen Shi Kwan
Wu Chi Chin
Ho Pak Kwong
Wong Mei
Jason Pai as carries silver to the cart
Wong Shu Tong
Wan Ling Kwong
Tam Bo
Law Keung
Chu Gam as clerk
Ho Bo Sing
Yuen Shing Chau
Ng Yuen Fan
Lee Siu Wah
Fung Hap So
Yuen Pak Chan
Goo Chim Hung as Horse buyer
Chik Nagi Hung
Hsu Hsia
Chui Chung Hok
Cheung Chi Ping
Chan Sing Tong
Chan Siu Gai
San Kuai
Hon Kwok Choi
Lau Jun Fai
Lai Yan
Yeung Wai
Tang Tak Cheung
Chui Fat

Box office
The film grossed HK$1,031,768.90 at the Hong Kong box office during its theatrical from 25 December 1969 to 8 January 1970 in Hong Kong.

External links

Have Sword, Will Travel at Hong Kong Cinemagic

1969 films
1960s action films
Hong Kong action films
Hong Kong martial arts films
Wuxia films
Kung fu films
1960s Mandarin-language films
Films directed by Chang Cheh
Shaw Brothers Studio films